Events from the year 1981 in the United States.

Incumbents

Federal government 
 President: Jimmy Carter (D-Georgia) (until January 20), Ronald Reagan (R-California) (starting January 20)
 Vice President: Walter Mondale (D-Minnesota) (until January 20), George H. W. Bush (R-Texas) (starting January 20)
 Chief Justice: Warren E. Burger (Minnesota)
 Speaker of the House of Representatives: Tip O'Neill (D-Massachusetts)
 Senate Majority Leader: Robert Byrd (D-West Virginia) (until January 3), Howard Baker (R-Tennessee) (starting January 3)
 Congress: 96th (until January 3), 97th (starting January 3)

Events

January

 January 16 – Women in Housing and Finance: conduct first meeting in New York City.
 January 19 – United States and Iranian officials sign an agreement to release 52 American hostages after 14 months of captivity.
 January 20 – Ronald Reagan is sworn in as the 40th President of the United States, and George H. W. Bush is sworn in as Vice President of the United States. Minutes later, Iran releases the 52 Americans held for 444 days, ending the Iran hostage crisis. 
 January 25 – Super Bowl XV: The Oakland Raiders defeat the Philadelphia Eagles 27–10 at the Louisiana Superdome in New Orleans, Louisiana.

February
 February 10 – A fire at the Las Vegas Hilton hotel-casino kills eight and injures 198.

March

 March 6 – After 19 years hosting the CBS Evening News, Walter Cronkite signs off for the last time.
 March 19 – Three workers are killed and five are injured during a test of the Space Shuttle Columbia.
 March 21 –  Michael Donald is lynched in Mobile, Alabama.
 March 30 – U.S. President Ronald Reagan is shot in the chest outside a Washington, D.C., hotel by John Hinckley Jr. Two police officers and Press Secretary James Brady are also wounded.
 March 31 – The 53rd Academy Awards, hosted by Johnny Carson, are held at the Dorothy Chandler Pavilion in Los Angeles. Robert Redford's directorial debut, Ordinary People, wins four awards, including Best Picture and Best Director. David Lynch's The Elephant Man and Martin Scorsese's Raging Bull tie in receiving eight nominations each.

April

 April 12 – The Space Shuttle program: Space Shuttle Columbia (John Young, Robert Crippen) launches on the STS-1 mission, returning to Earth on April 14.
 April 18 – A Minor League Baseball game between the Rochester Red Wings and the Pawtucket Red Sox at McCoy Stadium in Pawtucket, Rhode Island, becomes the longest professional baseball game in history: 8 hours and 25 minutes/33 innings (the 33rd inning is not played until June 23).
 April 26 – The 5.9  Westmorland earthquake shook the Imperial Valley of California with a maximum Mercalli intensity of VII (Very strong), causing $1–3 million in damage.

May
 May 15 – Donna Payant is murdered by serial killer Lemuel Smith, the first time a female correctional officer has been killed on-duty in the United States.

June
 June – The United States enters the severe early 1980s recession, exactly a year after the more minor 1980 recession ended; the unemployment rate is 7.2%
 June 5 – The Centers for Disease Control and Prevention report that five homosexual men in Los Angeles, California, have a rare form of pneumonia seen only in patients with weakened immune systems (the first recognized cases of AIDS).
 June 12
 Major League Baseball goes on strike, forcing the cancellation of 38 percent of the schedule.
 Raiders of the Lost Ark, directed by Steven Spielberg  is released as the first film of the Indiana Jones film series.
 June 21 – Wayne Williams, a 23-year-old African American, is arrested and charged with the murders of two other African Americans. He is later accused of 28 others, in the Atlanta child murders.
 June 29 – Morris Edwin Robert, armed with a machine gun, holds hostages in the FBI section at the Atlanta, Georgia Federal Building. After three hours, the hostages are rescued and Robert is killed in a shootout with federal agents.

July

 July 7 – President Ronald Reagan nominates the first woman, Sandra Day O'Connor, to the Supreme Court of the United States.
 July 8 – California Governor Jerry Brown, faced with a Mediterranean fruit fly infestation, chooses to delay the aerial spraying of malathion, in favor of continuing ground-based eradication efforts.
 July 9 – First release of Donkey Kong and debut of Mario.
 July 10 – Walt Disney Productions' 24th feature film, The Fox and the Hound, is released after a six month delay due to the departure of Don Bluth and his animation team from the studio. The film receives mixed-to-positive reviews and is a box office success.
 July 17 
Hyatt Regency walkway collapse: Two skywalks filled with people at the Hyatt Regency Hotel in Kansas City, Missouri collapse into a crowded atrium lobby, killing 114.
Israeli aircraft bomb Beirut, destroying multi-story apartment blocks containing the offices of PLO associated groups, killing approximately 300 civilians and resulting in worldwide condemnation and a U.S. embargo on the export of aircraft to Israel.
 July 27 – Adam Walsh, 6, is kidnapped from a Sears store in Hollywood, Florida.

August
 August 1 – MTV (Music Television) is launched on cable television in the United States.
 August 5 – U.S. President Ronald Reagan fires 11,359 striking air-traffic controllers who ignored his order for them to return to work.
 August 7 – The Washington Star ceases publication after 128 years.
 August 9 – Major League Baseball resumes from the strike with the All-Star Game in Cleveland's Municipal Stadium.
 August 10 – Exactly two weeks after his disappearance, the severed head of 6-year-old Hollywood, Florida native Adam Walsh is found in a canal in Vero Beach, Florida; to this day the rest of the boy's body has never been recovered.
 August 12 – The original Model 5150 IBM PC (with a 4.77 MHz Intel 8088 processor) is released in the United States at a base price of $1,565.
 August 19 
Gulf of Sidra incident (1981): Libyan leader Muammar al-Gaddafi sends 2 Sukhoi Su-22 fighter jets to intercept 2 U.S. fighters over the Gulf of Sidra. The American jets destroy the Libyan fighters.
U.S. President Ronald Reagan appoints the first female U.S. Supreme Court Justice, Sandra Day O'Connor.
 August 24 – Mark David Chapman is sentenced to 20 years to life in prison, after being convicted of murdering John Lennon in Manhattan eight months earlier.
 August 31 – A bomb explodes at the U.S. Air Force base in Ramstein, West Germany, injuring 20 people.

September
 September 10 – Picasso's painting "Guernica" is moved from New York City to Madrid.
 September 11 – A small plane crashes into the Swing Auditorium in San Bernardino, California, damaging the venue beyond repair.
 September 15 – The John Bull becomes the oldest operable steam locomotive in the world, at 150 years old, when it operates under its own power outside Washington, DC.
 September 17 – Ric Flair defeats Dusty Rhodes to win his first World Heavyweight Wrestling Championship in Kansas City.
 September 19 – Simon & Garfunkel perform The Concert in Central Park, a free concert in New York in front of approximately half a million people.
 September 25 
Sandra Day O'Connor takes her seat as the first female justice of the U.S. Supreme Court.
The Rolling Stones begin their Tattoo You tour at JFK Stadium in Philadelphia.

October
 October 28 
 The thrash metal band Metallica forms in Los Angeles.
 The Los Angeles Dodgers defeat the New York Yankees, 4 games to 2, to win their fifth World Series Title.

November
 November 12 – STS-2: Space Shuttle Columbia (Joe Engle, Richard Truly) lifts off for its second mission.
 November 16 – Luke and Laura marry on the U.S. soap opera General Hospital; it is the highest-rated hour in daytime television history.
 November 23 – Iran-Contra scandal: Ronald Reagan signs the top secret National Security Decision Directive 17 (NSDD-17), authorizing the Central Intelligence Agency to recruit and support Contra rebels in Nicaragua.
 November 30 – Cold War: In Geneva, representatives from the United States and the Soviet Union begin negotiating intermediate-range nuclear weapon reductions in Europe (the meetings end inconclusively on Thursday, December 17).

December

 December 5 – American general James L. Dozier is kidnapped in Verona by the Italian Red Brigades.
 December 8 – The No. 21 Mine explosion in Whitwell, Tennessee kills 13.
 December 11 – Boxing: Muhammad Ali loses to Trevor Berbick; this proved to be Ali's last-ever fight.
 December 28 – The first American test-tube baby, Elizabeth Jordan Carr, is born in Norfolk, Virginia.

Full date unknown
 Fire Away, a handheld electronic game, is released by Tandy.
 MDB Communications advertising and communications agency is founded.

Ongoing
 Cold War (1947–1991)
 Iran hostage crisis (1979–1981)
 Early 1980s recession (1981–1982)
 The Wayne Chicken Show (since 1981), held in Wayne, Nebraska

Births

January

 January 1
 Kelly Fremon Craig,  screenwriter, producer, and film director
 Eden Riegel, actress
 Justin Welborn, actor
 January 2
 JT Daly, musician, producer, songwriter, and visual artist, and frontman for Paper Route
 Kirk Hinrich, basketball player
 January 3 – Eli Manning, football player
 January 4
 Alicia Garza, civil rights activist 
 Aaron Schwartz, actor
 January 5
 Chris Drake, tennis player
 Brooklyn Sudano, actress 
 January 6
 Ejiro Evero, English-born football player and coach
 Camila Grey, singer/songwriter and guitarist
 Mike Jones, rapper
 Mobetta, jazz trumpeter, producer, and composer
 January 7
 Marquis Daniels, basketball player
 Jinxx, guitarist and member of Black Veil Brides
 January 8 – Genevieve Cortese, actress
 January 9
 Sam Arora, politician
 Nate Boyer, football player and Army Green Beret
 Cedric Cobbs, football player
 Caroline Lufkin, singer
 January 10
 Matt Brown, mixed martial artist
 Brian Joo, R&B singer
 Jared Kushner, investor
 January 11 – Mary Beth Decker, model and television personality
 January 12 – Quentin Griffin, football player
 January 13
 Reggie Brown, football player
 Shad Gaspard, wrestler (d. 2020)
 January 14 – Trieste Kelly Dunn, actress
 January 15
 Elvin Ayala, boxer
 Charleene Closshey, actress, musician, composer, and producer
 Howie Day, singer/songwriter
 Pitbull, hip-hop musician and record producer
 January 17
 Flash Brown, pornographic actor, model, and basketball player
 Scott Mechlowicz, actor 
 Ray J, rapper and singer
 January 19 – Elizabeth Tulloch, actress 
 January 20
 John Baker, baseball player
 Annie Black, politician
 Erika Davies, jazz vocalist and actress
 Jason Richardson, basketball player
 Clarke Tucker, politician
 January 21
 Amanda Aday, actress
 Damane Duckett, football player
 Josh Revak, politician
 January 22 
 Chantelle Anderson, basketball player
 Cameron Echols, basketball player
 Willa Ford, singer, television hostess, and actress 
 Beverley Mitchell, actress 
 Ben Moody, guitarist
 Raymond Raposa, singer/songwriter and frontman for Castanets (d. 2022)
 January 23
 Dan Antoniuk, soccer player
 Chuckie Campbell, musician, poet, fiction writer, editor, publisher, and educator
 January 24 – Carrie Coon, actress 
 January 25 – Alicia Keys, singer, pianist and actress
 January 26 – Ronald Dupree, basketball player
 January 27 – Gorilla Zoe, rapper
 January 28 – Elijah Wood, actor and producer
 January 29 – Jonny Lang, musician
 January 30 – Jonathan Bender, basketball player
 January 31 – Justin Timberlake, singer/songwriter, actor, record producer, and member of NSYNC

February

 February 1
 Bayard Elfvin, soccer player
 John Gemberling, actor and comedian
 Gina Ortiz Jones, politician
 February 2
 Lance Allred, basketball player 
 Nathan Barnatt, actor, comedian, dancer, YouTuber, and filmmaker
 Josh Kaul, politician
 Emily Rose, actress 
 February 3
 Kris Dielman, football player
 Alisa Reyes, actress
 February 4 – Dennis Dottin-Carter, football player
 February 5
 Jarvis Dortch, politician
 Nora Zehetner, actress
 February 6
 Ricky Barnes, golfer
 Calum Best, TV personality
 Alison Haislip, actress and TV personality
 February 7 – Jim Parrack, actor
 February 8 – Dawn Olivieri, actress
 February 9 – The Rev, drummer for Avenged Sevenfold (d. 2009)
 February 10
 Uzo Aduba, actress
 Stephanie Beatriz, actress
 Eric Dill, singer/songwriter
 February 11
 Jake Eaton, football player and athletic director
 Kelly Rowland, singer and actress
 February 13 – Joshua Deahl, judge
 February 15  
Matt Hoopes, guitarist and singer/songwriter, (Relient K)
Jenna Morasca, TV personality
Olivia, singer/songwriter and actress
 February 17
 Sean Michael Becker, director, producer, and editor
 T. J. Duckett, football player
 Joseph Gordon-Levitt, actor, director, producer and writer
 Paris Hilton, model and socialite
 February 18
 Jameel Dumas, football player
 Kamasi Washington, saxophonist
 February 19
 Beth Ditto, singer/songwriter and actress
 Blake Elliott, football player
 Jocko Sims, actor
 February 20 
 Majandra Delfino, actress
 Cody Donovan, mixed martial artist and Brazilian jiu-jitsu practitioner
 Fred Jackson, football player
 Adrian Lamo, convicted computer hacker (died 2018)
 Chris Thile, mandolinist
 February 21 – Katie Edwards-Walpole, politician
 February 23
 Josh Gad, actor, comedian, and singer
 Paleo, singer/songwriter
 Charles Tillman, American football player
 February 24 – Rob Bowen, baseball player
 February 26
 PJ Bianco, songwriter and record producer 
 Kertus Davis, race car driver
 Maria Sansone, journalist and Internet personality
 February 27
 Josh Groban, singer
 Nick Langworthy, politician
 February 28
 Brian Bannister, baseball player
 Erik Demaine, professor of Computer Science at MIT and former child prodigy

March

 March 1 
 Zach Cregger, actor and comedian
 Adam LaVorgna, actor 
 Brad Winchester, ice hockey player
 March 2
 Lance Cade, wrestler (d. 2010)
 Bryce Dallas Howard, actress
 Danielle Moné Truitt, actress
 March 3
 Ed Carpenter, race car driver
 Lil' Flip, rapper
 Bryan Steil, politician
 March 5 – Chris Arreola, boxer
 March 6 – Ellen Muth, actress
 March 8 – B. Dolan, rapper, spoken word artist, activist, screenwriter, and composer
 March 9
 Antonio Bryant, football player
 Chad Gilbert, guitarist for New Found Glory
 March 10 – Kristen Maloney, Olympic gymnast
 March 11
 David Anders, actor
 Mike Dusi, actor and producer
 Lee Evans, football player  
 LeToya Luckett, singer 
 March 13
 Mike Avilés, baseball player
 David Bailey, basketball player
 March 15 – Young Buck, rapper
 March 16
 Danny Brown, rapper and songwriter
 Julia Letlow, politician and widow of congressman-elect Luke Letlow
 March 17 – Kyle Korver, basketball player
 March 18 – Vanessa Lee Evigan, actress
 March 19 – Benny Fine, co-founder of React Media, LLC
 March 20
 Jake Hoffman, actor, director, and writer
 Levar Stoney, politician, mayor of Richmond, Virginia
 March 21 – Juju Castaneda, media personality, author, actress, and businesswoman
 March 22
 Will Ainsworth, politician, 31st Lieutenant Governor of Alabama
 Tiffany Dupont, actress
 MIMS, rapper
 March 23
 Jenn Brown, sports broadcaster and television host
 Erin Crocker, race car driver and broadcaster
 Brett Young, country singer/songwriter
 March 24
 Mike Adams, football player
 Mike Doss, football player
 Philip Winchester, actor
 March 25 – Casey Neistat, YouTube personality
 March 27
 Cory Butner, bobsledder
 Cesilie Carlton, diver
 Carey Davis, football player
 March 28
 Lindsay Frimodt, model
 Michael Sarver, musician
 Julia Stiles, actress
 March 29
 Jasmine Crockett, politician
 Megan Hilty, actress and singer
 PJ Morton, musician, singer, and producer
 March 30
 Jammal Brown, football player
 Jon DiSalvatore, ice hockey player
 Katy Mixon, actress
 March 31
 Ryan Bingham, actor and singer/songwriter
 Mark Ellebracht, politician

April

 April 1 – Dewitt Ellerbe, football player
 April 2
 Rod Davis, football player
 Josephine Decker, actress, filmmaker, and performance artist
 Bethany Joy Lenz, actress and singer
 April 3
 David Carlucci, politician
 Ryan Doumit, baseball player
 April 4
 Currensy, rapper
 Casey Daigle, baseball player
 Heather Edelson, politician
 April 5
 Matthew Emmons, Olympic rifle shooter
 Michael A. Monsoor, Navy SEAL and Medal of Honor recipient (d.2006)
 April 6
 Eliza Coupe, actress
 Kari Jobe, Christian singer/songwriter
 Alex Suarez, musician/multi instrumentalist, producer, songwriter, DJ, remixer and mixing/mastering engineer for Cobra Starship and This is Ivy League
 April 7
 Brian Dux, basketball player
 Vanessa Olivarez, singer
 Terrell Roberts, football player (d. 2019)
 April 8
 Lamon Archey, actor
 Brian Burres, baseball player
 Jeff Dugan, football player
 April 9
 Moran Atias, Israeli-born actress and model
 A. J. Ellis, basketball player
 Eric Harris, mass murderer (died 1999) 
 April 10
 Gretchen Bleiler, Olympic snowboarder
 Laura Bell Bundy, actress and singer
 Jax Dane, wrestler
 Michael Pitt, actor 
 Timmy Williams, actor and comedian 
 April 12 
 Tulsi Gabbard, politician
 Paul Rust, actor and comedian
 JP Sears, comedian and internet personality
 April 13 
 Bryan Davis, inventor and distiller
 Courtney Peldon, actress
 Brenden Shucart, HIV/AIDS and LGBT rights activist, actor, and writer
 April 16
 Russell Harvard, deaf actor
 Jake Scott, football player
 April 18
 Alessandra Ambrosio, Brazilian-born model, actress, fashion designer, businesswoman, and television personality
 Brian Buscher, baseball player
 Cameron Carpenter, organist and composer
 April 19
 Hayden Christensen, Canadian-born actor
 Troy Polamalu, football player
 Jonas Neubauer, tetris player
 April 21 – Paul Curtman, politician
 April 22 – Ken Dorsey, football player
 April 24 – Taylor Dent, tennis player
 April 27 – Drew Elliott, fashion model and television personality
 April 28
 Jessica Alba, actress and businesswoman
 Lester Estelle II, drummer and backing vocalist for Pillar
 April 29
 Guy Blakeslee, psychedelic and stoner rock musician
 Alex Vincent, actor  
 April 30
 Tom Barrett, politician
 Tom Goss, singer/songwriter and actor

May

 May 1 – Wes Welker, football player  
 May 2 – Robert Buckley, actor 
 May 3
 Farrah Franklin, singer
 Trevor Strnad, singer and frontman for The Black Dahlia Murder (d. 2022)
 May 4
 Matt DeMarchi, American-born Italian ice hockey player
 Jason Kander, politician and podcaster
 Dallon Weekes, musician 
 May 5 
 Chris Duncan, baseball player (died 2019) 
 Danielle Fishel, actress 
 Zach McGowan, actor
 May 6 – Bubba Dickerson, golfer
 May 7 – Monzavous Edwards, American-born Nigerian sprinter
 May 10 – Koko Archibong, Nigerian-born basketball player
 May 11
 Heidi Cortez, entrepreneur, coach, model, and writer
 JP Karliak, actor, voice actor and comedian
 Austin O'Brien, actor and photographer 
 Daniel Ortmeier, baseball player
 May 12 – Rami Malek, actor
 May 13
 Jeremy Bobb, actor
 Herman Cornejo, Argentine-born ballet dancer
 Jimmy Yang, wrestler
 May 15 – Jamie-Lynn Sigler, actress
 May 16 – Dwan Edwards, football player
 May 17
 Bronwen Dickey, author, journalist, and lecturer
 R. J. Helton, singer
 May 18
 Jesse Cox, YouTube gaming personality, comedian, voice actor, and media commentator
 Desus Nice, television, YouTube, and Twitter personality
 Adam Green, singer/songwriter
 May 20
 Wally Adeyemo, Nigerian-born politician
 Rachel Platten, singer/songwriter
 Lindsay Taylor, basketball player
 May 21
 Scott Aaronson, theoretical computer scientist
 Craig Anderson, ice hockey player
 Belladonna, actress, director, producer, model, and pornographic and erotic actress
 Josh Hamilton, baseball player
 May 22
 Eric Butorac, tennis Player
 Daniel Bryan, wrestler
 Melissa Gregory, figure skater
 May 23
 Dessa, rapper, singer/songwriter, record executive, and member of Doomtree
 Tim Robinson, actor and comedian 
 Charles Rogers, football player (died 2019)
 May 24 – Elijah Burke, wrestler
 May 25 – Logan Tom, Olympic volleyball player
 May 26
 Craig Callahan, American-born Italian basketball player
 Anthony Ervin, Olympic swimmer
 Isaac Slade, singer/songwriter and pianist
 Ben Zobrist, baseball player
 May 27
 Nick Barnett, football player
 Darnell Dockett, football player
 May 28
 Laura Bailey, voice actress 
 Aaron Schock, politician
 May 29
 Justin Chon, actor
 Alton Ford, basketball player (died 2018)
 Anders Holm, actor and comedian  
 Brian Simnjanovski, football player (died 2009) 
 Randall Woodfin, politician, mayor of Birmingham, Alabama
 May 30
 Devendra Banhart, singer/songwriter and visual artist
 Blake Bashoff, actor
 Frankie Delgado, Mexican-born actor, producer, and television personality
 May 31 – Jake Peavy, baseball player

June

 June 1
 Brandi Carlile, singer/songwriter
 David Eastman, politician
 Smush Parker, basketball player
 Johnny Pemberton, actor and comedian
 Amy Schumer, comedian, actress, and screenwriter
 June 2
 Jared Burton, baseball player
 Velvet Sky, wrestler
 June 3
 Sam Amidon, singer/songwriter and multi-instrumentalist
 Rich Rundles, baseball player (d. 2019) 
 June 4
 Paul Daniels, rower
 Tonya Evinger, mixed martial artist
 T.J. Miller, comedian, actor, and screenwriter
 June 6
 Brent Darby, basketball player
 Johnny Pacar, actor
 June 7
 Shireen Ghorbani, politician
 Tyler Johnson, baseball player
 Larisa Oleynik, actress
 June 8
 Alex Band, musician
 Ashley Biden, social worker, activist, philanthropist, fashion designer, and daughter of U.S. President Joe Biden
 DJ Cobra, deejay
 Rachel Held Evans, Christian columnist, blogger and author (died 2019) 
 John E. James, businessman, veteran, and political candidate
 Sara Watkins, violinist 
 June 9
 Drew Anderson, baseball player
 Natalie Portman, Israeli-born actress
 June 10
 Jonathan Bennett, actor and model 
 Joshua Claybourn, attorney, author, and historian
 Glenn Earl, football player
 June 11 – Andy Dean, radio talk show host, political commentator, and media executive
 June 12 
 John Gourley, musician and singer
 Jeremy Howard, actor 
 June 13 – Chris Evans, actor
 June 15 
 Billy Martin, guitarist, songwriter, and illustrator 
 Jeremy Reed, baseball player
 Haley Scarnato, singer 
 Maxey Whitehead, voice actress 
 June 16
 Ben Kweller musician
 Joe Saunders, baseball player
 June 17
 Kyle Boller, football player
 Danny Core, baseball player
 June 18 – Scooter Braun, media proprietor, record executive, and investor
 June 19
 Mario Duplantier, French-born drummer for Gojira
 Melissa McMorrow, boxer
 June 20 – Demarco Castle, singer and rapper
 June 21
 Jeff Baker, baseball player
 Wesley Duke, football player
 Brandon Flowers, singer/songwriter and vocalist for The Killers
 June 22 – Monty Oum, animator, director, and screenwriter (d. 2015)
 June 24 
 Harvey Dahl, football player
 Tilky Jones, singer and actor
 Cris Lankenau, actor 
 Vanessa Ray, actress and singer 
 June 27
 DJ Cassidy, record producer and MC
 John Driscoll, actor
 June 28
 Antoine Becks, Canadian-born musician, singer, producer, and actor
 June 29
 Anthony Crawford, bassist, songwriter, producer, and recording artist
 Joe Johnson, basketball player
 June 30 – Andrew Alberts, ice hockey player

July

 July 1
 Jenna Arnold, businessperson, entrepreneur, and co-founder of ORGANIZE
 Matt Carson, baseball player
 Amanda Seales, comedian, actress, rapper and songwriter
 July 2
 Yeti Beats, record producer and songwriter
 Alex Koroknay-Palicz, activist  
 July 4 
 Brock Berlin, football player
 Will Smith, football player (d. 2016)
 July 5 – Ryan Hansen, actor
 July 6 
 Nnamdi Asomugha, football player
 Eddie Bonine, baseball player
 John Cox, Venezuelan-born basketball player
 Charles Drake, football player
 Mike Karney, football player
 Synyster Gates, guitarist for Avenged Sevenfold
 July 7
 Brad James, actor
 Synyster Gates, guitarist for Avenged Sevenfold
 Tasha Cobbs Leonard, gospel musician and songwriter 
 July 8 – Lance Gross, actor, model and photographer 
 July 11 – Andre Johnson, football player
 July 12 – Phil Dumatrait, baseball player
 July 13
 Monica Byrne, playwright and science fiction author
 Fran Kranz, actor
 July 14 – Teri Reeves, actress
 July 15
 Lowell Bailey, Olympic biathlete
 Taylor Kinney, actor and model
 July 16 – Jessica Clemmons, singer/songwriter
 July 17
 Chris Brown, politician
 Josh Scogin, singer and vocalist for '68
 July 17 – Luke Dowler, songwriter, performer, and producer
 July 19
 Scott Clements, poker player
 Josh Dobson, politician
 Angela Trimbur, actress, writer, dancer, choreographer, and television personality
 July 20
 Jessica de la Cruz, politician
 James Dolan, computer security expert and co-developer of SecureDrop (d. 2017)
 July 21
 Gregory Chaney, politician
 Blake Lewis, singer/songwriter and beatboxer 
 Chrishell Stause, actress
 July 22 – Kevin Eakin, football player
 July 23 – Jacob Frey, politician, mayor of Minneapolis, Minnesota
 July 24
 Mohammed Amer, Kuwaiti-born comedian
 Steven Anderson, evangelist and founder of the New Independent Fundamentalist Baptist movement
 Liz Climo, cartoonist, animator, children's book author, and illustrator
 Summer Glau, actress
 Vanessa Ray, actress
 July 26
 Peter Depp, stand-up comedian, gay rights activist, anti-bullying activist, writer, and actor
 Clifford Dukes, football player
 July 27 – Dash Snow, artist (died 2009) 
 July 28 
 Billy Aaron Brown, actor
 Jen Day, politician and weightlifter
 Cole Williams, actor
 July 29
 Jenna Edwards, beauty pageant title holder
 Mark Estelle, American-born Canadian football player
 Dyana Liu, actress
 July 30
 Rob Emerson, mixed martial artist
 Nicky Hayden, motorcycle racer (d. 2017)
 July 31
 Vernon Carey, football player
 John Edwards, basketball player
 M. Shadows, singer and frontman for Avenged Sevenfold
 Eric Lively, actor 
 Brandon Scott, actor

August

 August 1
 Jeremy Cooney, politician
 Jordan Wall, actor
 August 2
 Dylan Dreyer, television meteorologist and news correspondent
 Rich Edson, journalist for FoxNews
 Ebi Ere, American-born Nigerian basketball player
 August 3 – Travis Willingham, voice actor  
 August 4
 Amanda Congdon, vlogger and internet host
 Andy Dillard, basketball player
 Marques Houston, singer and actor (IMx) 
 Abigail Spencer, actress
 Meghan, Duchess of Sussex, American-born actress and member of the British Royal Family
 August 5
 Reilly Brown, comic book artist and writer
 Carl Crawford, baseball player
 Travie McCoy, alternative hip-hop artist and frontman for Gym Class Heroes
 Rachel Scott, murder victim (d. 1999)
 Jesse Williams, actor, director, producer, and activist
 August 6
 Marc Cavosie, ice hockey player
 Leslie Odom Jr., actor and singer 
 August 8 – Meagan Good, actress
 August 9 – Pam Dreyer, ice hockey player
 August 12
 Matt Caldwell, politician
 Steve Talley, actor
 August 13 – Cory Doyne, baseball player
 August 14
 Earl Barron, basketball player
 Barrett Brown, journalist and founder of Project PM
 Scott Lipsky, tennis player
 Ray William Johnson, actor, comedian, rapper and YouTuber
 August 15
 Nate Butler, songwriter, music producer, vocal producer, and recording artist
 Adam Craig, mountain bike cyclist
 August 17 – Clinton Romesha, U.S. Army Veteran in the Afghan War and Medal of Honor recipient
 August 18 – Jeff Bourns, amputee tennis player
 August 20 – Epiphany, wrestler
 August 21
 John Beck, football player and coaching consultant
 Ross Thomas, actor 
 August 22
 Olivier Busquet, poker player
 Justin R. Cox, soccer player and entrepreneur
 Frank Davis, football player
 Ross Marquand, actor
 August 23 – Anthony Dobbins, American-born Italian basketball player
 August 24 – Chad Michael Murray, fashion model, actor and spokesperson
 August 25
 Bobby Berk, reality star and interior designer
 Rachel Bilson, actress
 Andrew Chambliss, television writer and producer
 August 26
 Jon Condo, football player
 Kosha Dillz, rapper
 Derek Edwardson, ice hockey player
 Nico Muhly, contemporary classical composer
 Karla Mosley, actress and singer
 August 27
 Sahba Aminikia, Iranian-born composer, artistic director, performer and educator
 Allison Ball, politician
 Aaron Espe, singer/songwriter, instrumentalist, and record producer
 August 28
 Dan Deacon, electronic music composer
 Charlie Frye, football player
 Jake Owen, country singer
 August 29 – Brian Chesky, co-founder and CEO of Airbnb
 August 30 – Cole Escovedo, mixed martial artist
 August 31
 T. J. Cummings, basketball player
 Dennis Dove, baseball player
 ForBiddeN, cosmetologist and MySpace Internet celebrity (d. 2017)

September

 September 1
 Boyd Holbrook, actor
 Clinton Portis, football player
 September 2 – Dan Ramos, politician (d. 2023)
 September 4 
 Beyoncé, singer/songwriter and member of Destiny's Child
 Hagar Chemali, political satirist, writer, producer, television personality, and political commentator
 Jero, American-born Japanese enka singer  
 Lacey Mosley, vocalist for Flyleaf
 September 5 – Aaron Bay-Schuck, music industry executive and CEO and co-chairman of Warner Records
 September 7 – Jeremy Arel, YouTuber and Brazilian Jiu Jitsu artist
 September 8 
 Dan Fredinburg, Google executive 
 Jonathan Taylor Thomas, actor
 September 9
 Basil Dannebohm, politician
 Julie Gonzalo, Argentine-born actress and producer
 September 11
 Benjamin Downing, politician
 Hallowicked, wrestler
 Dylan Klebold, mass murderer (died 1999)
 Charles Kelley, country singer/songwriter and founding member of Lady Antebellum
 September 12
 Jennifer Hudson, singer and actress
 Hosea Chanchez, actor
 September 13 – EJay Day, singer/songwriter
 September 14
 Cody Clark baseball player
 Ashley Roberts, singer (The Pussycat Dolls)
 September 15
 Daniel Brummel, singer/songwriter, composer, producer, and multi-instrumentalist
 Ben Schwartz, actor, voice actor, comedian, writer, director, and producer
 September 16
 Alexis Bledel, actress and model
 Patrick Dideum, freestyle swimmer
 September 18 – Jennifer Tisdale, actress
 September 19
 Ahmad Abousamra, Syrian-born terrorist (d. 2017)
 Scott Baker, baseball player
 Atari Bigby, football player
 Scott Bradlee, musician, pianist, and YouTuber
 September 20 – Shemia Fagan, politician
 September 21 – Nicole Richie, actress, singer, and socialite 
 September 22
 Silas Daniels, football player
 Ashley Eckstein, actress, voice actress, and fashion designer 
 September 23
 Evan Brewer, bassist
 Brandon Victor Dixon, actor, singer, and theatrical producer
 Misti Traya, actress 
 September 24
 Leigh Bodden, football player
 Ryan Briscoe, Australian-born racing driver
 Kris McCray, mixed martial artist
 September 25 
 Rocco Baldelli, baseball player
 Jason Bergmann, baseball player
 Nat Cassidy, actor, writer, and musician
 Jennifer Carroll Foy, politician
 Van Hansis, actor 
 Lee Norris, actor  
 Shane Tutmarc, singer/songwriter and frontman for Dolour  
 September 26
 Alondra Cano, politician
 Christina Milian, R&B singer and actress
 Serena Williams, tennis player
 September 27
 Cytherea, pornographic actress and model
 Mike Esposito, baseball player
 Anand Giridharadas, writer 
 September 28
 Greg Anderson, pianist, composer, video producer, and writer
 David Baas, football player
 Melissa Claire Egan, actress 
 September 29
 Shay Astar, actress and singer/songwriter
 Atiyyah Ellison, football player
 September 30
 Parks Bonifay, wakeboarder
 Dominique Moceanu, Romanian-born gymnast
 Ashleigh Aston Moore, child actress (d. 2007)

October

 October 2
 Erwin Dudley, basketball player
 Peter Evans, trumpeter
 October 3
 Seth Gabel, actor
 Matthew O. Williams, U.S. Army veteran in the Afghan War and Medal of Honor recipient
 October 4 – Curtis Deloatch, football player
 October 5
 Jeanette Antolin, gymnast
 Isaiah Ekejiuba, Nigerian-born football player
 Robert Drysdale, Brazilian-born mixed martial artist
 October 7
 Dria, singer/songwriter
 Austin Eubanks, motivational speaker (d. 2019) 
 October 8 – Brett Dietz, football player and coach
 October 9 
 Zachery Ty Bryan, actor
 Phillip LaRue, singer/songwriter and producer
 Darius Miles, basketball player
 October 10
 Lisa Davies, model
 Jonathan Evans, football player
 October 12
 Jonathan Babineaux, football player
 Tom Guiry, actor  
 Brian J. Smith, actor
 October 13
 Taylor Buchholz, baseball player
 Jared Emerson-Johnson, video game music composer, sound designer, voice director, and voice actor
 October 14 – Boof Bonser, baseball player
 October 15
 Keyshia Cole, singer/songwriter and television personality
 Abram Elam, football player
 October 16
 Frankie Edgar, mixed martial artist
 Boyd Melson, boxer
 October 17
 Cameron Esposito, actor, comedian, and podcaster
 Holly Holm, mixed martial artist
 October 20
 Zach Conine, politician
 Willis McGahee, football player
 October 21
 Brian Claybourn, football player
 Kate Gallego, politician, mayor of Phoenix, Arizona
 October 22
 John Boyd, actor
 Anthony Brown, gospel musician
 Michael Fishman, actor 
 October 24 – Tila Tequila, model and television personality
 October 25 – Austin John, singer/songwriter and frontman for Hinder (2001-2013)
 October 26 – Sam Brown, actor and comedian 
 October 28
 Sean Considine, football player
 Dawen, singer/songwriter
 Noah Galloway, wounded Army Soldier, motivational speaker, and Dancing With The Stars contestant  
 October 29 – Amanda Beard, Olympic swimmer
 October 30 
 Chris Clemons, football player
 Fiona Dourif, actress, daughter of Brad Dourif
 Ivanka Trump, model, advisor, and daughter of 45th President of the United States Donald Trump
 October 31
 Doveman, pianist, producer, and singer
 Frank Iero, guitarist for My Chemical Romance

November

 November 1
 Matt Jones, actor and comedian 
 LaTavia Roberson, singer, originally of Destiny's Child
 November 2 – Ai, Japanese-born singer/songwriter
 November 3
 Blair Chenoweth, beauty queen
 Karlos Dansby, football player
 Jackie Gayda, wrestler 
 Travis Richter, singer and guitar for From First to Last
 November 4
 Robert Bingaman, artist
 Vince Wilfork, football player
 November 5 – Regulo Caro, singer/songwriter
 November 6
 Cassie Bernall, murder victim of the Columbine High School massacre (d. 1999)
 Graham Colton, singer/songwriter
 Vicente Escobedo, boxer
 November 8
 Brad Davis, soccer player
 Jocelin Donahue, actress
 Alonzo Ephraim, football player
 Azura Skye, actress
 November 9
 Eyedea, musician, rapper, and poet (d. 2010)
 Sarah Godlewski, politician
 Scottie Thompson, actress  
 November 10
 Jeff Darlington, ESPN television reporter
 Jason Dunham, Medal of Honor recipient (died 2004)  
 Ryback, wrestler
 November 11 – Susan Kelechi Watson, actress 
 November 13
 Ryan Bertin, wrestler and coach
 Wesley Hunt, military veteran and politician
 Kirsten Price, model and adult film star
 Rivkah, author and illustrator
 November 14
 Vanessa Bayer, actress and comedian
 Zach Dailey, tennis player
 November 15
 Chris Dixon, football player
 Drew Hodgdon, football player
 November 16 – Caitlin Glass, voice actress 
 November 17
 Tremmell Darden, basketball player
 Doug Walker, Italian-born internet film critic, comedian, and actor (Nostalgia Critic)
 November 18
 Mekia Cox, actress and dancer
 Tim DeChristopher, climate activist and co-founder of Peaceful Uprising
 Nasim Pedrad, Iranian-born actress and comedian
 Maggie Stiefvater, author
 Allison Tolman, actress
 Christina Vidal, actress and singer
 November 19 – Marcus Banks, basketball player
 November 20 – Carlos Boozer, basketball player
 November 21
 Adimchinobe Echemandu, Nigerian-born football player
 Bryant McFadden, football player
 November 22 – Rolando Delgado, mixed martial artist and trainer
 November 24
 Krystal Ball, political commentator and television host
 Jared Cohen, businessman and CEO of Jigsaw
 Terrance Dotsy, football player
 November 25 
 Barbara Pierce Bush, daughter of U.S. President George W. Bush
 Jenna Bush Hager, daughter of U.S. President George W. Bush
 Chevon Troutman, basketball player
 November 26 – Julian Dorio, drummer for The Whigs
 November 28 – Erick Rowan, wrestler
 November 29
 Kimberly Cullum, actress 
 John Milhiser, actor and comedian
 November 30 – Beau Bokan, singer and frontman for Blessthefall

December

 December 2 – Britney Spears, singer, dancer, and actress
 December 3
 Brian Bonsall, actor and musician
 Tiffany Cole, convicted murderer
 Liza Lapira, actress 
 Tyjuan Hagler, football player
 December 4 – Lila McCann, singer
 December 6
 Beth Allen, golfer
 Jerome Dennis, football player
 December 7
 Shawn Dailey, bassist, music manager, and producer
 Matthew Dominick, US Navy test pilot and NASA astronaut
 December 8
 Jeremy Accardo, baseball player
 Charlie Anderson, football player
 Cory Blaser, MLB umpire
 Kory Casto, baseball player
 Philip Rivers, football player
 December 9 – Katie Cook, comic artist and writer
 December 11 
 Rebekkah Brunson, basketball player and coach
 Jeff McComsey, author and illustrator
 Kevin Phillips, actor
 Zacky Vengeance, guitarist for Avenged Sevenfold
 December 12 
 Ronnie Brown, football player
 C. S. E. Cooney, fantasy literature writer
 Shane Costa, baseball player
 Jon Dunn, football player
 Spencer Johnson, football player  
 December 13
 Astronautalis, hip-hop artist
 Mathis Bailey, American-born Canadian novelist and fiction writer
 Amy Lee, singer/songwriter and frontperson for Evanescence
 December 15 – Thomas Herrion, football player (died 2005)  
 December 16
 A. J. Allmendinger, race car driver
 Andy Dugan, actor and filmmaker
 Krysten Ritter, actress, musician, model and author
 December 17 – Nick Baumgartner, Olympic snowboarder
 December 18 – Javarus Dudley, football player
 December 19 – Drake Diener, basketball player
 December 20
 Patrick Damphier, singer/songwriter, multi-instrumentalist, and record producer
 Royal Ivey, basketball player
 James Shields, baseball player
 Roy Williams, football player
 December 21 – Frankie Abernathy, purse designer and television personality (d. 2007)
 December 23
 Jordan Baker, MLB umpire
 Arik Cannon, wrestler
 December 25 – Tawny Ellis, film producer and daughter of stuntman turned director David R. Ellis
 December 26
 Drama, dirty south rapper
 Kevin Lacz, Navy SEAL
 December 27
 Tank Daniels, football player
 Jay Ellis, actor
 December 28
 Elizabeth Jordan Carr, first American test-tube baby
 Nicholas Duran, politician
 Jamar Enzor, football player
 Sienna Miller, American-born English actress
 Sa-Roc, rapper
 December 29 
 Meena Dimian, broadcaster, writer, actor, and international television personality
 Ericka Dunlap, beauty pageant winner, Miss America 2003, and Miss America 2004
 December 30
 Stevie Baggs, football player
 Kyle Eckel, football player
 December 31
 Toby Barker, politician
 Jason Campbell, football player

Date Unknown

 Jessica D. Aber, attorney
 Josh Abramson, entrepreneur and co-founder of CollegeHumor
 Katrina Andry, visual artist and printmaker
 Antigirl, multidisciplinary artist and graphic designer
 Will Aronson, composer
 Clint Baclawski, photography and installation artist
 Annie Baker, playwright and teacher
 Nathan Baskerville, politician
 Benjamin Beaton, judge
 Lukas Biewald, entrepreneur and founder and CEO of Figure Eight Inc.
 Brandon B. Brown, politician
 Katie Brown, rock climber
 Aileen Cannon, judge
 Beau Carey, painter and educator
 Lindsay Nicole Chambers, actor
 Elizabeth Chomko, playwright, film director, screenwriter, and actress
 Zachary Cotler, filmmaker, poet, and novelist
 Nick Courtright, poet
 Amber Cowan, artist and educator
 Donald Cumming, actor, musician, and singer/songwriter
 Ryan Dahl, software engineer, creator of JavaScript as TypeScript
 Angela Davis, chef, food blogger, recipe developer, and cookbook author
 Adriana DeMeo, actress
 Kevin Deutsch, criminal justice journalist and author
 Abigail DeVille, sculptor and installation artist
 Francesca DiMattio, artist
 Leila Djansi, Ghanaian-born filmmaker
 Lucy Dodd, painter and installation artist
 Kate Durbin, writer, digital and performance artist
 Lydia Edwards, politician
 Brian Elliot, social entrepreneur and speaker on technology, innovation, and social impact
 Corrie Erickson, oil painter, graphic designer, and illustrator
 Arlen Escarpeta, Belizean-born actor
 Rachael Eubanks, politician
 Mark Evitts, composer, producer, string arranger, and multi-instrumentalist
 JB McCuskey, politician
 Emily Young McQueen, wheelchair racer
 Frankie Shaw, actress and filmmaker
 Weirdo, fine artist (born Jeff Jacobson)

Deaths

 January 5
 Frederick Osborn, philanthropist and eugenicist (b. 1889)
 Harold Urey, winner of the Nobel Prize in Chemistry (b. 1893)
 January 7 – John Pascal, playwright, screenwriter, author and journalist (b. 1932)
 January 8 – Matthew Beard, child film actor (b. 1925)
 January 10
 Katharine Alexander, film actress (b. 1898)
 Richard Boone, Western film actor (b. 1917)
 January 11 – Beulah Bondi, actress (b. 1888)
 January 13 – Robert Kellard, film actor (b. 1915)
 January 25 – Adele Astaire, dancer (b. 1896)
 February 9
 Jack Z. Anderson, U.S. Representative from California (b. 1904)
 Bill Haley, rock & roll musician (b. 1925)
 February 22 – Ilo Wallace, wife of Henry A. Wallace, Second Lady of the United States (born 1888)
 March 5 – Yip Harburg, lyricist (b. 1896)
 March 7 – Bosley Crowther, film critic (b. 1905)
 March 9 – Max Delbrück, biologist, recipient of the Nobel Prize in Physiology or Medicine (b. 1906 in Germany)
 April 4  – Brad Johnson, actor (b. 1924)
 April 5
 Bob Hite, musician (b. 1943)
 Lucile Godbold, Olympic athlete (b. 1900)
 April 7 – Norman Taurog, film director (b. 1899)
 April 8 – Omar N. Bradley, U.S. Army General (b. 1893)
 April 12 – Joe Louis, African American heavyweight boxer (b. 1914)
 April 15 – John Thach, naval aviator and admiral (b. 1905)
 April 26
 Jim Davis, television actor (b. 1909)
 Madge Evans, actress (b. 1909)
 April 27 – John Aspinwall Roosevelt, businessman and philanthropist (b. 1916)
 April 28 – Cliff Battles, American footballer (Boston Redskins) (b. 1910)
 May 9 – Nelson Algren, novelist (b. 1909)
 May 11 – Bob Marley, reggae musician (b. 1945 in Jamaica)
 May 18
 Arthur O'Connell, actor (b. 1908)
 William Saroyan, dramatist and author (b. 1908)
 May 23 – George Jessel, actor and entertainer (b. 1898)
 May 28 – Mary Lou Williams, jazz pianist (b. 1910)
 June 1 – Carl Vinson, U.S. Congressman (b. 1883) 
 June 9 – Allen Ludden, television game show host (b. 1917) 
 July 10 – Ken Rex McElroy, murder victim (b. 1934)  
 July 27
 Adam Walsh, murder victim and son of John Walsh (b. 1974)
 William Wyler, film director (b. 1902)
 July 29 – Robert Moses, urban planner (b. 1888)
 August 15 – Carol Ryrie Brink, author (b.1895)
 November 3 – H. C. Westermann, sculptor and printmaker (b. 1922)
 November 7 – Will Durant, philosopher and writer (b. 1885)
 November 12 – William Holden, film actor (b. 1918)
 November 17 – Sibyl M. Rock, mathematician (b. 1909)
 November 27 – Lotte Lenya, singer (b. 1898 in Vienna)
 November 29 – Natalie Wood, actress (b. 1938)
 December 2 – Wallace Harrison, architect (b. 1895)
 December 6 – Harry Harlow, psychologist (b. 1905)
 December 13 – Pigmeat Markham, African American vaudevillian (b. 1904)
 December 27 – Hoagy Carmichael, composer and singer (b. 1899)

See also
 1981 in American television
 List of American films of 1981
 Timeline of United States history (1970–1989)

References

External links
 

 
1980s in the United States
United States
United States
Years of the 20th century in the United States